William James Duggleby (March 16, 1874 – August 30, 1944), nicknamed "Frosty Bill", was a pitcher for the Philadelphia Phillies. He played from 1898 to 1907. He also played two games for the Philadelphia Athletics in 1902 and nine games for the Pittsburgh Pirates in 1907. Duggleby is the first of four major league players to hit a grand slam in his first major league at-bat, followed by Jeremy Hermida, Kevin Kouzmanoff, and Daniel Nava. He was the only pitcher to hit a grand slam for their first major league hit until July 8, 2021, when Daniel Camarena became the second.  , he still holds the Phillies team record for hit batsmen for a career (82).

Duggleby was one of the "jumpers" who left the Phillies in 1902 for other teams, including (in Duggleby's case) Connie Mack's new American League team, the Athletics. The Phillies filed suit to prevent the "jumpers" — in particular, Nap Lajoie, Bill Bernhard, and Chick Fraser — from playing for any other team, a plea which was rejected by a lower court before being upheld by the Pennsylvania Supreme Court. Duggleby was the first of the "jumpers" to return to the Phillies, on May 8, 1902, after playing only two games with the A's.

He was the manager of the Minor League Baseball team, the Albany Babies, in 1912.

Duggleby, a native of Utica, New York, died in Redfield, New York in 1944.

See also
List of players with a home run in first major league at-bat
History of the Philadelphia Athletics for more on the "jumpers"
List of Major League Baseball career hit batsmen leaders

External links

1874 births
1944 deaths
Major League Baseball pitchers
Baseball players from New York (state)
Philadelphia Phillies players
Philadelphia Athletics players
Pittsburgh Pirates players
19th-century baseball players
Minor league baseball managers
Auburn Maroons players
Wilkes-Barre Coal Barons players
Montreal Royals players
Philadelphia Athletics (minor league) players
Harrisburg Ponies players
Toronto Canucks players
Rochester Bronchos players
Montgomery Climbers players
Albany Babies players
Sportspeople from Utica, New York